Purple Kiss (stylized in all caps) is a South Korean girl group formed by RBW in 2020. The group consists of six members: Na Go-eun, Dosie, Ireh, Yuki, Chaein and Swan. Originally a seven member group, Park Ji-eun left the group on November 18, 2022, due to poor health issues. They are considered to be a self-producing group, with members involved in songwriting, composing and other aspects of their music and showmanship.

The group released two pre-debut digital singles—"My Heart Skip a Beat" in November 2020, and "Can We Talk Again" in February 2021—before their official debut on March 15, 2021, with the EP Into Violet.

Name

The group's name is a compound word: "purple" with the idea that the color is made through more than one color; and the word "kiss" symbolizing love. It imprints on the aspect of the diverse personalities of each member's musical color mixed in harmony, hence, the meaning of Purple Kiss is to "convey love through various colors of music."

History

2018–2021: 365 Practice and pre-debut activities

365 Practice
Purple Kiss, then known as 365 Practice, began activities through an eponymous YouTube channel in March 2018, used by RBW to highlight their female trainees' daily lives, school activities, and practices. The channel introduced all seven future members of Purple Kiss, alongside other trainees who were not added to the final lineup.

During and prior to this period, multiple members appeared on various Korean reality shows and participated in other domestic activities. In 2011 and 2014, Chaein appeared on K-pop Star for seasons 1 and 3. In late 2017, Dosie competed on Mix Nine, ranking 74th. In June 2018, Park Ji-eun and Na Go-eun competed on Produce 48, placing 80th and 29th respectively.

On May 25, 2019, 365 Practice held their "All-Ways" mini-concert at RBW Art Hall to commemorate 100,000 YouTube subscribers. In July 2019, Swan recorded the guide vocals for "Snapping" by Chungha. On November 2, 2019, they accompanied Mamamoo's Moonbyul to perform for charity at the Seongdong Fashion Sewing Village Festival.

In their later trainee days, members participated music projects such as LunCHbox, with Dosie, Swan, and Go-eun joining the line-up of featured artists. Yuki and Lee Ye-sol, a former trainee, were featured in Hwang Sung-jin's album Hwang Sung Jin Project Secondary words Vol.2 on the track "Be With You." Go-eun recorded the single "Fly" for the soundtrack of the 2019 television series Possessed. On May 26, 2020, the entire group appeared as dancers in Onewe's "End of Spring" music video, alongside Oneus.

Formation of Purple Kiss and pre-debut singles
On June 19, 2020, a debut trailer was released on the 365 Practice channel, officially announcing the group's name as Purple Kiss. The final line-up—consisting of Park Ji-eun, Na Go-eun, Dosie, Ireh, Yuki, Chaein, and Swan—was revealed from July 20 to August 1 with individual music video trailers introducing each of the members, culminating in a group trailer on August 3, 2020.

Purple Kiss released their first pre-debut digital single, "My Heart Skip a Beat" on November 26, 2020. Swan did not participate in the single or its music video due to a temporary health-related hiatus. The song received positive attention from Korean media, and featured choreography created by the members as well as an original rap section written by Yuki. The group's second pre-debut single, "Can We Talk Again," was released on February 3, 2021, and featured all seven members. The single, a subdued R&B track, contrasted significantly with the rock-inspired "My Heart Skip a Beat," meant to showcase the group's musical versatility.

2021: Introduction and debut with Into Violet and Hide & Seek
On February 28, Purple Kiss announced their debut, which would be the EP Into Violet. It was released on March 15. with the second track "Ponzona" serving as the EP's lead single with an accompanying music video. Into Violet peaked at number 11 on the Gaon Album Chart whilst "Ponzona" at number 99 on the Download Chart.

On September 8, Purple Kiss released their second EP Hide & Seek, with the lead single "Zombie". The lead single was co-written by Yuki, alongside labelmate CyA, with the group having writing and composing credits for most of the songs on the album.

On December 18, Purple Kiss released the winter digital single "My My".

2022–present: MemeM, Geekyland  Park Jieun's Departure and Cabin Fever
On March 29, 2022, Purple Kiss released their third EP MemeM, with the lead single of the same name.

On July 25, 2022, Purple Kiss released their fourth EP Geekyland, with the lead single "Nerdy".

On November 18, 2022, RBW announced that Park Ji-eun had made the decision to leave the group due to her poor health condition and anxiety symptoms, making Purple Kiss a six-member group.

On February 15, 2023, Purple Kiss released their fifth EP Cabin Fever, with the lead single "Sweet Juice".

Members

Current

 Na Go-eun – vocalist, dancer
 Dosie – dancer, vocalist
 Ireh – dancer, vocalist
 Yuki – rapper, dancer
 Chaein – vocalist, dancer, rapper
 Swan – vocalist

Former

 Park Ji-eun – vocalist

Timeline

Discography

Extended plays

Singles

Collaborations

Other charted songs

Videography

Music videos

Filmography

Reality shows

Awards and nominations

Listicles

Notes

References

2020 establishments in South Korea
Musical groups established in 2020
Musical groups from Seoul
K-pop music groups
South Korean girl groups
South Korean dance music groups